Fairmount may refer to:

Places

Canada
 Fairmount, Frontenac County, Ontario
 Fairmount, Grey County, Ontario
 Fairmount, Nova Scotia

United States of America
 Fairmount, Delaware
 Fairmount, Georgia
 Fairmount, Illinois
 Fairmount, Indiana
 Fairmount, Iowa
 Fairmount, Kansas
 Fairmount, Maryland
 Fairmount, New Jersey
 Fairmount Historic District (Califon, New Jersey), listed on the NRHP in Hunterdon County and Morris County, New Jersey
 Lower Fairmount, New Jersey
 Fairmount Township, New Jersey
 Fairmount, New York
 Fairmount, North Dakota
 Fairmount Township, Luzerne County, Pennsylvania
 Fairmount, Tennessee
 Neighborhoods
 Fairmount, Louisville, Kentucky
 Fairmount (Duluth), Minnesota
 Fairmount, Newark, New Jersey
 North Fairmount, Cincinnati
 South Fairmount, Cincinnati, Ohio
 Fairmount, Philadelphia, Pennsylvania
 Fairmount, Richmond, Virginia
 Fairmount Park, Philadelphia, Pennsylvania

Transportation
 Fairmount Line, in Massachusetts, United States
 Fairmount station (MBTA), in Boston, Massachusetts, United States
 Fairmount station (SEPTA), in Philadelphia, Pennsylvania, United States

Other uses
 Fairmount Food Group
 DuBose Conference Center, originally established as Fairmont College, Monteagle, Tennessee

See also 
 Fairmount Hotel (disambiguation)
 Fairmount Park (disambiguation)
 Fairmont (disambiguation)